Anson Phelps Stokes, the 3rd (January 11, 1905 - November 7, 1986) was the eleventh bishop of the Episcopal Diocese of Massachusetts in Boston, Massachusetts from 1956 to 1970.

Biography 
He was the son of Anson Phelps Stokes and grandson of Anson Phelps Stokes of Phelps Dodge. An alumnus of St. Paul's School (Concord, New Hampshire), he received a BA from Yale in 1927, a BD from the Episcopal Theological School (now the Episcopal Divinity School), a DD from Kenyon College and later degrees from Columbia, Berkeley Divinity School, and Suffolk University. He was ordained deacon in 1932 and priest on March 19, 1933 in St Mark's Church, Shreveport, Louisiana.

He was married to Hope Procter of the family which founded Procter & Gamble.

References

Web page about the three Anson Phelps Stokes
New York Times Obituary of Hope Procter widow of Rt. Rev. Anson Phelps Stokes
Episcopal Church Obituary of Hope Procter widow of Rt. Rev. Anson Phelps Stokes

1905 births
1986 deaths
Episcopal Divinity School alumni
Kenyon College alumni
Episcopal bishops of Massachusetts
Yale Divinity School alumni
20th-century American Episcopalians
20th-century American clergy